Cuddalore Division Highways Department (Construction & Maintenance) aims to develop and maintain the Highway network in the district and also ensures road safety and to cope with the future economic development of the state.

In Cuddalore Highways (C & M) Division, the total length of 1862.957 Kilometre of Government roads are maintained.

Sub-Division 
Cuddalore Highways Division has 7 Sub–Division.

 Cuddalore sub-division the total length of kilometer 220.645 are maintained.

 Panruti sub-division the total length of kilometer 281.101 are maintained.

 Kurinjipadi sub-division the total length of kilometer 353.359 are maintained.

 Vridhachalam sub-division the total length of kilometer 272.225 are maintained.

 Thittagudi sub-division the total length of kilometer 309.675 are maintained.

 Chidamabram sub-division the total length of kilometer 177.548 are maintained.

 Kattumannarkoil sub-division the total length of kilometer 404 are maintained.

Classification 

The Classification of road are as follows

 State Highways (SH) the total length of Kilometre is 249.00

 Major District Roads (MDR) the total length of Kilometre is 449.00

 Other District Roads (ODR) the total length of Kilometre is 1165.00

State Highways

Major District Road

Other District Roads

See also 
 Highways of Tamil Nadu 
 Road Network in Tamil Nadu
 National Highways
 List of National Highways in India
 List of National Highways in India (by Highway Number)
 National Highways Authority of India

References 

Roads in Tamil Nadu
Tamil Nadu highways
Tamil Nadu-related lists